Irena  is a village in the administrative district of Gmina Zaklików, within Stalowa Wola County, Subcarpathian Voivodeship, in south-eastern Poland.

3 October 1942 the German gendarmerie pacified the village. Germans murdered 12 residents and burnt a few buildings

References

Irena